is one of syllable in Javanese script that represent the sound /nɔ/, /na/. It is transliterated to Latin as "na", and sometimes in Indonesian orthography as "no".

Pasangan 
Its pasangan form , is located on the bottom side of the previous syllable. For example,  - mangana (eat, imperative), which, although transliterated with a single 'n', is written using double '' because the rootword ('mangan', to eat) ends in ''.

Murda 

Glyphs

Unicode block 

Javanese script was added to the Unicode Standard in October, 2009 with the release of version 5.2.

References 

Javanese script